Pablo Gabriel Cuevas Urroz (born January 1, 1986) is an inactive Uruguayan professional tennis player. Cuevas won the 2008 French Open men's doubles title with Luis Horna.

He has won six singles titles and has a career-high singles ranking of World No. 19. Cuevas' career-high doubles ranking is World no. 14, which he achieved in April 2009.

In September 2019, Cuevas led the Uruguayan Davis Cup team to a victory over the Dominican Republic, winning entry into the highest Davis Cup tier, the World Group.

Professional career

Early career
At the 2007 French Open, Cuevas and Argentine partner Carlos Berlocq made the third round of the men's doubles tournament. Cuevas won the Tunica, Scheveningen, and Lima singles Challenger titles, and the São Paulo-1 and Florianópolis-2 doubles Challenger titles.

2008
Cuevas opened the year at the Movistar Open in Viña del Mar, Chile. He earned his first tour-level victory in his first-round match against Guillermo Coria. He then beat Fernando Verdasco and José Acasuso, before falling in the semifinals against Fernando González. Cuevas reached his career-high singles ranking of no. 88 following Viña del Mar.

In March, Cuevas qualified for the Sony Ericsson Open in Miami, his first ATP Masters Series event. He defeated Vince Spadea in the first round, before falling to Fernando González in the second round. At Houston, he partnered with Spaniard Marcel Granollers to reach the doubles final, falling to Ernests Gulbis and Rainer Schüttler.

At the 2008 French Open in May, Cuevas partnered with Peruvian Luis Horna to win the doubles title. On their way to the title, the pair defeated seventh seeds Arnaud Clément and Michaël Llodra in the first round, ninth seeds Lukáš Dlouhý and Leander Paes in the third round, top seeds Bob and Mike Bryan in the quarterfinals, and second-seeded Daniel Nestor and Nenad Zimonjić in the final. They defeated Nestor and Zimonjić 6–2, 6–3, in only 56 minutes to win the title. Cuevas and Horna became the first all-South American team to win a Grand Slam men's doubles title, and Cuevas became the second Uruguayan, after Fiorella Bonicelli, to win a Grand Slam title.

2009
At the 2009 Movistar Open in Viña del Mar, Cuevas, as in 2008, reached the semifinals in singles, where he met local favorite Fernando González. González won the match 6–3, 6–2. In doubles, Cuevas paired with Argentinean Brian Dabul, and together they won the tournament, winning the final against František Čermák and Michal Mertiňák, 6–3, 6–3. This win helped Cuevas achieve his doubles ranking high of no. 17 in the world on February 9, 2009.

In the first round at Wimbledon in 2009, Cuevas defeated Christophe Rochus of Belgium in a come-from-behind victory, 3–6, 4–6, 6–4, 6–1, 11–9. In the second round, he lost to 21-year-old Jesse Levine of the U.S. (who defeated Marat Safin in the first round), 6–2, 6–1, 4–6, 4–6, 6–3.

Cuevas qualified into the 2009 International German Open. He reached the semifinals of that tournament by beating Björn Phau, ninth-seeded Jürgen Melzer, eighth-seeded Philipp Kohlschreiber, and 14th-seeded Nicolás Almagro in the quarterfinals. He lost his semifinal match with Paul-Henri Mathieu, 6–4, 3–6, 5–7.

Cuevas played in the 2009 Kremlin Cup as fifth seed. He advanced to the quarterfinals by defeating Lu Yen-hsun and Teymuraz Gabashvili. He lost in the quarterfinals to Mikhail Kukushkin, 6–4, 1–6, 4–6. He did, however, win the doubles title, partnering Marcel Granollers.

2010

Cuevas defeated eight-seeded Albert Montañés at the 2010 Abierto Mexicano Telcel to reach quarter-finals, where he lost to David Ferrer. At the 2010 Kremlin Cup he beat world number 11 Nikolay Davydenko in second round and fifth-seeded Radek Stepanek in quarter-finals, then was defeated by eventual champion Viktor Troicki.

2011
He went 0–4 at the start of 2011, but on arrival at the Sony Ericsson Open in Miami, he defeated both Michael Berrer and world number 8 Andy Roddick by the same score, 6–4, 7–6, to reach the third round.

At the 2011 U.S. Men's Clay Court Championships, Cuevas beat third seeded Guillermo Garcia-Lopez to reach semi-finals, where he lost to Kei Nishikori.

At the 2011 Estoril Open he defeated third-seeded Jo-Wilfried Tsonga and sixth-seeded Thomaz Bellucci in consecutive matches to reach the semifinals, where he lost to Juan Martín del Potro.

After losing in first round of Roland Garros, Cuevas underwent knee surgery and did not play on tour for two years.

2012
Cuevas did not play at all in 2012 due to injury.

2013 

The Uruguayan played again in ATP Challenger Tour events in May 2013. He won the first round match at Roland Garros. Later he defeated eight-seeded Nikolay Davydenko at first round of the 2013 Proton Malaysian Open.

2014 

In 2014, Cuevas won the first round matches at the Rio Open, Portugal Open and Roland Garros. At the Swedish Open, he beat sixth-seeded Jérémy Chardy, third-seeded Fernando Verdasco and fifth-seeded João Sousa to win his first ATP 250 tournament and became number 61 in the ATP ranking.

One week later, he won his second ATP tournament at the Umag Croatia Open. Cuevas had to play the qualifying round, defeating Nikolas Walterscheid-Tukic,  Nikola Čačić and Renzo Olivo. In the main tournament, he beat Croatian Mate Delić 4–6, 6–4, 6–4, then Italian Andreas Seppi 6–3, 6–1, Russian Teymuraz Gabashvili 6–3, 4–6, 6–2 in the quarterfinals, and finally, on Sunday, he beat Fabio Fognini in semifinals, and second-seeded Tommy Robredo in the finals, without losing a set, 6–3, 6–4. After the tournament he rose to inside the world's top 40 in the ATP rankings for the first time in his career.

In November, the Uruguayan won the Challenger Ciudad de Guayaquil and Uruguay Open singles clay tournaments.

2015 
At the 2015 Australian Open, Cuevas lost in first round to unseeded player Matthias Bachinger. In the doubles event, he partnered David Marrero to reach quarterfinals, where they were beaten by Fabio Fognini and Simone Bolelli.

He began the Latin American season with his third ATP singles title at the ATP 250 São Paulo, after beating Jiri Vesely, Nicolás Almagro, and Santiago Giraldo. Later he beat Almgaro again, and then Albert Montañés to reach the third round of the Rio 500, where he was defeated by clay master Rafael Nadal in three sets. Also, together with Marrero, he beat Vesely and Frantisek Cermak to reach the quarterfinals of the doubles event.

At the ATP 250 Buenos Aires, he lost to local Juan Mónaco in quarterfinals. Cuevas then played the Davis Cup Americas Zone round versus Colombia, where he lost to Alejandro González and defeated Giraldo. He partnered his brother Martín to defeat doubles specialists Juan Sebastián Cabal and Robert Farah.

At the Indian Wells Masters, Cuevas defeated Jarkko Nieminen to reach the third round, where he lost to Feliciano López. This was his best singles result in big tournaments since his third-round appearance at the 2011 Miami Masters. In the doubles event, he lost in the first round to Nadal and Pablo Carreño Busta. Cuevas lost in second round of the Miami Masters to Thomaz Bellucci.

At the inaugural ATP 250 Istanbul Open, as the third seed, first defeating Teymuraz Gabashvili, Thomaz Bellucci, and Grigor Dimitrov, the second seed, to reach his fourth ATP Tour level final, where he lost to Roger Federer.

2016
He won the 2016 Rio Open by defeating Rafael Nadal in the semifinals and Argentine Guido Pella in the final. The next week, he won the Brasil Open in São Paulo by defeating Spaniard Pablo Carreño Busta in the final. He was the runner up at the 2016 Nottingham Open to Steve Johnson. He was runner up at the 2016 German Open to Martin Klizan. Cuevas struggled to put together wins over the rest of the year, falling in the second round at the 2016 Rio Olympics and the 2016 US Open.

2017
Cuevas went 1-4 to start 2017, including a first-round loss at the 2017 Australian Open, but he rebounded with a title at the 2017 Brasil Open where he defeated Albert Ramos-Viñolas. He followed that with a strong quarterfinal appearance at the 2017 Indian Wells Masters. As the No. 27 seed, he defeated Martin Klizan, Fabio Fognini, and No. 11 seed David Goffin before falling to Pablo Carreño Busta. 
He followed that up with another Masters-level quarterfinal appearance at the 2017 Monte-Carlo Masters, where he defeated No. 3 seed Stan Wawrinka in straight sets. He lost to Lucas Pouille in the quarterfinals. At the same tournament, he won his second Masters 1000 doubles title partnering with Rohan Bopanna defeating 7th seeded Spanish duo of F. Lopez/M. Lopez.

His strong results on clay continued at the 2017 Mutua Madrid Open, where he reached the first Masters semifinal of his career. Cuevas defeated Thomaz Bellucci, Nicolas Mahut, Benoit Paire, and Alexander Zverev to reach the semifinals. World No. 9 Dominic Thiem ended his run with a 6-4, 6-4 win. Cuevas would make the third round of the 2017 French Open later that spring. He then lost his next nine matches before ending the year with a third-round appearance in the 2017 Rolex Paris Masters, where he lost to Rafael Nadal in three sets.

2018
Cuevas defeated world number 6 Dominic Thiem in the third round of Indian Wells. He lost in the fourth round to Hyeon Chung in straight sets. At the Madrid Open, he made it to the third round before being defeated by world number 9 John Isner in 3 tiebreaks.

Cuevas broke his foot in the summer which limited his activity for the rest of the year.

2019
Cuevas won his first challenger title in almost 2 years at the Tunis Open. 3 weeks later, he would win another one at the 2019 Open du Pays d'Aix.

At the Estoril Open, Cuevas qualified for the main draw as a lucky loser and made it all they way to the finals before being defeated by top seed and world number 10 Stefanos Tsitsipas in straight sets.

At the French Open, Cuevas made the third round to match his best result at the tournament for the fourth time before being defeated by world number 4 Dominic Thiem.

2020
Cuevas was part of team Uruguay for the Inaugural 2020 ATP Cup but lost all of his matches to Japan'sYoshihito Nishioka, Spain's Rafael Nadal, and Georgia's Nikoloz Basilashvili.

Cuevas made back-to-back quarterfinals at Córdoba and Buenos Aires. He lost to eventual champion Cristian Garín in Córdoba and had four match points against top seed Diego Schwartzman in Buenos Aires, but fell short.

2021
Cuevas qualified for the main draw at the Geneva Open. There, he made it to the semifinals defeating top players such as Reilly Opelka and 4th seed and former world number 3 Grigor Dimitrov. He lost to 2nd seed Denis Shapovalov in straight sets.

At the French Open, he played world number 1 Novak Djokovic in the second round. He lost in straight sets.

At the 2021 Open Sopra Steria de Lyon, Cuevas won both the singles and the doubles along with his brother Martín Cuevas.

Davis Cup
Cuevas made his debut for the Uruguay Davis Cup team in April 2004 at the age of 18. He is 29–7 in Davis Cup singles matches and 13–5 in Davis Cup doubles matches combining for an overall record of 42–12.

Playing style
Pablo Cuevas has a clay-court style of play. He utilizes heavy topspin off his forehand side and plays a one-handed backhand. His one-handed backhand creates excellent angles to hit passing shots. Cuevas also has a good slice. For most of his serves, he uses a heavy kick serve. Most of his skill set was on display when he defeated Andy Roddick in Miami in 2011.
Cuevas is also known for trickshots.

Performance timelines

Singles
Current through the 2022 U.S. Men's Clay Court Championships.

Doubles

Mixed doubles

Significant finals

Grand Slam finals

Doubles: 1 (1 title)

Masters 1000 finals

Doubles: 2 (2 titles)

ATP career finals

Singles: 10 (6 titles, 4 runners-up)

Doubles: 17 (9 titles, 8 runners-up)

Challenger and Futures finals

Singles: 24 (18–6)

Doubles: 43 (22–21)

Record against top 10 players
Cuevas' match record against players who have been ranked No. 10 or higher, with those who have been ranked No. 1 in boldface.

 Nicolás Almagro 4–1
 Pablo Carreño Busta 4–3
 Diego Schwartzman 3–4
 Jo-Wilfried Tsonga 2–0
 Nikolay Davydenko 2–1
 Nicolás Lapentti 2–1
 Jack Sock 2–1
 Jürgen Melzer 2–2
 Radek Štěpánek 2–2
 Grigor Dimitrov 2–3
 Fernando Verdasco 2–3
 Fabio Fognini 2–5
 Dominic Thiem 2–5
 Marcos Baghdatis 1–0
 James Blake 1–0
 Guillermo Cañas 1–0
 Marin Čilić 1–0
 Guillermo Coria 1–0
 Gastón Gaudio 1–0
 David Goffin 1–0
 Gustavo Kuerten 1–0
 Tommy Robredo 1–0
 Andy Roddick 1–0
 Alexander Zverev 1–0
 Tomáš Berdych 1–1
 Hubert Hurkacz 1–1
 Lucas Pouille 1–1
 Mariano Puerta 1–1
 Denis Shapovalov 1–1
 Stan Wawrinka 1–1
 Mikhail Youzhny 1–1
 Juan Carlos Ferrero 1–2
 Karen Khachanov 1–3
 Milos Raonic 1–3
 Gaël Monfils 1–4
 Gilles Simon 1–4
 Rafael Nadal 1–5
 Matteo Berrettini 0–1
 Novak Djokovic 0–1
 Mardy Fish 0–1
 Richard Gasquet 0–1
 John Isner 0–1
 Kei Nishikori 0–1
 Janko Tipsarević 0–1
 Roberto Bautista Agut 0–2
 Felix Auger-Aliassime 0–2
 Juan Martín del Potro 0–2
 Roger Federer 0–2
 Casper Ruud 0–2
 Kevin Anderson 0–3
 Andy Murray 0–3
 David Ferrer 0–4
 Fernando González 0–4
 Stefanos Tsitsipas 0–4
 Juan Mónaco 0–5

Wins over top 10 players 
Cuevas has a  record against players who were ranked in the top 10 at the time the match was played.

Notes

References

External links
 
 
 
 
 
 
 
 
 Cuevas World Ranking History

1986 births
Living people
People from Entre Ríos Province
Argentine people of Uruguayan descent
Sportspeople of Uruguayan descent
People with acquired Uruguayan citizenship
Uruguayan people of Argentine descent
Sportspeople of Argentine descent
Sportspeople from Montevideo
Uruguayan male tennis players
French Open champions
Grand Slam (tennis) champions in men's doubles
Olympic tennis players of Uruguay
Tennis players at the 2016 Summer Olympics